As of September 2016, the International Union for Conservation of Nature (IUCN) lists 24 extinct species, 17 possibly extinct species, and two extinct in the wild species of reptile.

Turtles and tortoises

Extinct species

Extinct in the wild species
Black softshell turtle (Nilssonia nigricans)

Lizards

Extinct species

Possibly extinct species

Snakes

Extinct species

Possibly extinct species

See also 
 List of least concern reptiles
 List of near threatened reptiles
 List of vulnerable reptiles
 List of endangered reptiles
 List of critically endangered reptiles
 List of data deficient reptiles

References 

Reptiles
Recently extinct reptiles
Recently extinct reptiles